Gholamhossein Mohammadnia is a former member of the nuclear talks negotiations team. He was Iran's ambassador to Albania from August, 2016, until December, 2018, when he was expelled from the country for "damaging its national security.”

Some media reports see his expulsion in connection with a failed terrorist plot against the Israeli soccer team in Tirana, back in 2016, while others link it to an overall escalation of tensions between the countries, since Albania took in about 3000 members of the opposition group People's Mujahedin of Iran.

References

Ambassadors of Iran to Albania
Year of birth missing (living people)
Living people